The 2000 Tennessee Volunteers football team represented the University of Tennessee in the 2000 NCAA Division I-A football season.  Phillip Fulmer was the head coach and led the Volunteers to an appearance in the 2001 Cotton Bowl Classic.

Schedule

Roster

Rankings

Team players drafted into the NFL

References:

Awards and honors
John Henderson, Defensive tackle, Outland Trophy
Shawn Hobbs, Wide receiver,  Longest SEC reception (89)

References

Tennessee
Tennessee Volunteers football seasons
Tennessee Volunteers football